The Department of Safety was an artist-run community space founded in 2002, located in Anacortes, Washington's old police and fire station. It housed an all-ages music venue, art gallery, artist residency program, zine library, darkroom, artists' studios and living amenities for a handful of residents.  Department of Safety provided hostel accommodations for travelers from 2002 until 2005, when the operators decided to focus on the Artist in Residence program. Department of Safety hosted music festivals, workshops, high school classes, hundreds of concerts, art exhibits, recording sessions, weddings, halloween parties and lectures.

History

The model of the DoS suggested two years of commitment from residents to work on the space and programming itself while simultaneously giving those individuals access to facilities to focus on their own artistic practice.  Residents paid rent and insurance to live in the space; the programming was not subsidized by other means. The building was owned by a local used-car salesman.

The DoS incubated numerous high school and independent music acts and artists.  Families were often known to attend events as a unit.  Programming reflected a direct commitment to community while also prioritizing national and international talent.  

In January 2003 the DoS featured in an episode of The Savvy Traveler radio show.

In 2003, DoS collaborated with the APE Theatre Company to produce a play, Pills, Thrills and Automobiles. The true story told the tragic tale of a group of teenagers who crashed horrifically on the motorway while driving back from a music festival after a weekend of drug taking and sleep deprivation. The work was debated in the House of Commons of the United Kingdom.

The Department of Safety helped to host the annual What the Heck Fest.

The Department of Safety ceased operations in February 2010.

Associated artists and projects 
Some notable record labels and musicians associated with the Department of Safety are:

 Knw-Yr-Own Records
 K Records
 Marriage Records
 Karl Blau
 Geneviève Castrée
 D+
 Dirty Projectors
 The Lonely Forest
 Mount Eerie
 Norfolk & Western
 p:ano
 The Robot Ate Me
 Thanksgiving
 Urban Honking
 Laura Veirs
 Veneer Magazine
 Aaron Flint Jamison

References

External links
 Department of Safety website
 The Mercury Summer Fun Action Guide The Portland Mercury, May 20, 2004.

Music venues in Washington (state)
Social centres in the United States
2002 establishments in Washington (state)
Buildings and structures in Skagit County, Washington